The Timber Rock Railroad (TIBR) is a shortline rail carrier operating in the states of Texas and Louisiana.  Its single line runs from Kirbyville, Texas to DeRidder, Louisiana, about 41.5 miles.  It is owned by the Watco Companies.

History
The TIBR began operations in 1998 when Watco leased the Kirbyville to DeRidder line from what is now the BNSF Railway. This line had been completed in 1906 by the Jasper and Eastern Railroad, a subsidiary of the Atchison, Topeka and Santa Fe.  Watco later leased other lines from BNSF, including Kirbyville to Tenaha, Texas in 2002, Kirbyville to Silsbee, Texas in February 2004, and Somerville, Texas to Silsbee in July 2004.  At that point, the line was operating across about 290 miles of track.  But thereafter, the line began discontinuing service on various segments.  By the time in early 2017 when the BNSF exercised an option to take back over operation of the trackage from Silsbee to Tenaha, TIBR was reduced to the original Kirbyville to DeRidder line.

Operations
Besides the endpoints of Kirbyville and DeRidder, the line serves Bon Wier, Texas and Merryville, Louisiana.

While the TIBR will move any commodity, the primary traffic on the line is aggregates, lumber products, plastics, and fuel.

The line interchanges with the BNSF in Kirbyville, and the Kansas City Southern Railway in DeRidder.

References

Notes

Louisiana railroads
Texas railroads
Watco